Yehezkel Nafshy (born 24 November 1977) is an Israeli poet and writer. Yehezkel was born in Petah Tikva, Israel. He began his literary career at a young age.

Career
At age 17, he first published fantasy stories in magazines such as wiz, Last Sorcerer and others, often using pseudonyms. When he was 20, he was hospitalized for a year and a half due to a rare birth defect. During his stay at the hospital he wrote his book Opening Now that won the Eisenberg prize and many literary grants.

His poems have been translated into Arabic, Hindi, French, English, German and Russian. His poems were turned into songs by singers including Dan Toren, Eyal Gazit, Jasmine Even and Abigail Cohen. His Poem "At the Hour of the Objects" composed by singer E. B. Dan and was playing on the radio and the Israeli music channel 24. Nafshy was the youngest deputy editor of the literature journal, Moaznaim between 2003 and 2005 alongside poet Moshe Ben Shaul.

In March 2013, he published the first volume of his trilogy Self Portrait at Emda publishing house. The third edition of the first volume, entitled when fear of god falls upon me', was published in June 2013.

Yehezkel organized a series of literary evenings at the theatre Habima called "Report on the Human Condition" which combine poets, writers and musicians such as Jeremy Kaplan, Dan Toren, Dudi Levy and others. He was chief editor to the series of exhibitions "Poet's dialog" and editor of the literary corner on the "campus voice" radio station. in 2011, he participated in the project musical spells'' by Jasmine Even.

On the poet and his creation 
 Mini-site on literature and poetry of T. Greco.
 Eli Eshed, grace of god
 Eli Eshed, Yehezkel Nafshy's poets and artists dialog
 Mati Shemoelof, joy the young poetry, KETEM, issue 2, February 2007
  Kol Yisrael

Interviews
  Channel 1 (Israel) with Yehezkel Nafshy
 Boaz Cohen interviews Yehezkel Nafshy, 16.6.2008, Globes
 Yehezkel Nafshy interviews on his book, Self Portrait on Maariv, The Marker
  on Erev Hadash with Harel Segal
  on "Madafim" show in Kol Ha Campus.
 A chapter from Yehezkel Nafshy's book, Self Portrait on ynet.
 A Writer?! : Yehezkel Nafshy interviews about his book Self Portrait for nrg.
  on Tal Man's TV show.
  by Amir Lev

1977 births
Israeli poets
People from Petah Tikva
Living people